Mukim Bukit Sawat is a mukim in Belait District, Brunei. It had a population of 794 in 2016.

Geography 
The mukim is located in the east of Belait District, bordering Mukim Telisai, Mukim Ukong and Mukim Rambai of Tutong District to the north, north-east and east respectively, Mukim Sukang to the south, Mukim Labi to the west and Mukim Liang to the north-west.

The mukim is named after Kampong Bukit Sawat, one of the villages it encompasses.

Demographics 
As of the 2016 census, the population was 794 with  males and  females. The mukim had 220 households occupying 220 dwellings. The entire population lived in rural areas.

Villages 
As of 2016, the mukim comprised the following census villages:

Facilities

Schools 
The primary schools in the mukim include:
 Merangking Primary School
 Orang Kaya Pemancha Berandai Primary School, Bukit Sawat — initially established as a Malay school and built in 1932. A newer building was inaugurated on 28 August 1971 to replace the older building.

Mosques 
 Al-Mashor Mosque, Kampong Sungai Mau — inaugurated by the then Prince Al-Muhtadee Billah on 28 February 1992; it can accommodate 200 worshippers.
 
 Kampong Bukit Sawat Mosque — built in 1990 and can accommodate 120 worshippers.

References 

Bukit Sawat
Belait District